Otahuhu Rugby Football Club is a rugby union club based in Auckland, New Zealand. The club was established in 1926  and is affiliated with the Auckland Rugby Football Union. The club have historically been one of the most successful in Auckland history, having won the Gallaher Shield on nine occasions, most recently in 2000. Otahuhu have also produced numerous Auckland and international representatives, including 13 All Blacks.

Honours
Auckland Club Championship (9) 1956*, 1959, 1960, 1961, 1963, 1965, 1969, 1982, 2000

 *Shared with University.

All Blacks
Bert Palmer
Henry Brown
Des Christian
Frank McMullen
Waka Nathan
Mack Herewini
Peter Murdoch
Ron Urlich
Barry Ashworth
Brad Mika
Keven Mealamu

External links
Auckland RFU club profile

References

Sport in Auckland
New Zealand rugby union teams
Rugby union in the Auckland Region